HD 90264 is a binary star system in the southern constellation of Carina. It has the Bayer designation of L Carinae, while HD 90264 is the star's identifier in the Henry Draper catalogue. This system has a blue-white hue and is faintly visible to the naked eye with an apparent visual magnitude of 4.97. It is located at a distance of approximately 402 light years from the Sun based on parallax, and is drifting further away with a radial velocity of around +12 km/s. The system is a member of the Lower Centaurus Crux association of the Sco-Cen Complex.

This system was found to be a close double-lined spectroscopic binary in 1977, consisting of two B-type main-sequence stars. They appear to be spin-orbit synchronized. Both stars appear to be deficient in helium. The primary is a helium variable star while the companion is a mercury-manganese star. The variability of both stars aligns favorably with the orbital period.

References 

B-type main-sequence stars
SX Arietis variables
Mercury-manganese stars
Spectroscopic binaries
Lower Centaurus Crux

Carina (constellation)
Carinae, L
Durchmusterung objects
090264
050847
4089